"Party for One" is a song by Canadian singer Carly Rae Jepsen. It was released as the lead single from her fourth studio album Dedicated on November 1, 2018, through 604, School Boy and Interscope Records. The track was written by Jepsen, Tavish Crowe, Julia Karlsson, and Anton Rundberg, and produced by Hightower and Captain Cuts. "Party for One" was placed on Rolling Stones list of 50 Best Songs of 2018.

Background
Jepsen worked on the song for some time, first writing the melody with her long-time collaborator Tavish Crowe. The lyrics were inspired by staying in a hotel room in Sweden on her own, at a time when she was going through a break-up. The singer explained that the song is about "what it is to celebrate time with yourself". Matt Moen of Paper described the song as a "self-care anthem" or something to help refrain from texting an ex. Mike Wass of Idolator said that as the lead single for Jepsen's fourth studio album, it is "likely to cement her status as the hipster's guilty pleasure with a collection of cute, clever and slightly offbeat bops". A number of critics noted references to masturbation in the song's lyrics.

Jepsen posted an image of herself to social media on October 30, 2018, captioning it "Party for one", confirming social media rumours about the song's impending release after it was registered with BMI. Despite being promoted as the lead single from Dedicated, "Party for One" is not included in the standard track listing and only appears on select digital and deluxe editions of the album.

Critical reception
Upon its release, "Party for One" received critical acclaim. Brittany Spanos of Rolling Stone called the song "upbeat" and "bubbly". Brooke Bajgrowicz of Billboard said the track is "driven by an electric beat" and compared its "infectious pop sound" to "Call Me Maybe" and "I Really Like You". Writing for Pitchfork, Bobby Finger felt that "In the pantheon of pop breakup anthems, Jepsen's newest single lacks the aching detail of 'Dancing on My Own' or the Max Martin alchemy of 'Since U Been Gone,' but it's a satisfying intimation that E•MO•TION could be getting a sequel soon". Roisin O'Connor of The Independent named "Party for One" a "glimmering gem of a synth-pop track".

Year-end lists

Music video
The music video, directed by Bardia Zeinali, was released on November 1, 2018. It features Jepsen checking into a hotel for the night before showing scenes of other people in the same hotel alone in their rooms, doing various things such as dancing, crying, eating and putting on makeup. The power then goes out, which causes everybody to walk down to the lobby, where they have a party before returning to their rooms. Roisin O'Connor of The Independent called the video "fun, even if it is one giant advert for Absolut Vodka". On December 11, 2018, Jepsen released a vertical video of the song on YouTube.

Live performances
Jepsen performed "Party for One" for the first time on The Tonight Show Starring Jimmy Fallon on November 5, 2018. The song was performed live throughout The Dedicated Tour.

Track listing
 Digital download/Streaming
 "Party for One" — 3:03

 Digital Remix EP
 "Party for One" (More Giraffes Remix) — 2:46
 "Party for One" (Sawyr Remix) — 3:02
 "Party for One" (Anki Remix) — 3:29

Charts

Release history

References

2018 singles
2018 songs
Carly Rae Jepsen songs
Songs written by Carly Rae Jepsen
Vertically-oriented music videos
604 Records singles
Schoolboy Records singles
Interscope Records singles
Song recordings produced by Captain Cuts
Songs written by Anton Rundberg